Making the sign of the cross, or blessing oneself or crossing oneself, is a ritual blessing made by members of some branches of Christianity. This blessing is made by the tracing of an upright cross or + across the body with the right hand, often accompanied by spoken or mental recitation of the Trinitarian formula: "In the name of the Father, and of the Son, and of the Holy Spirit. Amen."

The use of the sign of the cross traces back to early Christianity, with the second century Apostolic Tradition directing that it be used during the minor exorcism of baptism, during ablutions before praying at fixed prayer times, and in times of temptation.

The movement is the tracing of the shape of a cross in the air or on one's own body, echoing the traditional shape of the cross of the Christian crucifixion narrative. Where this is done with fingers joined, there are two principal forms: one—three fingers, right to left—is exclusively used by the Eastern Orthodox Church, Church of the East and the Eastern Catholic Churches in the Byzantine, Assyrian and Chaldean traditions; the other—left to right to middle, other than three fingers—sometimes used in the Latin Church of the Catholic Church, Lutheranism, Anglicanism and in Oriental Orthodoxy. The sign of the cross is used in some denominations of Methodism and within some branches of Presbyterianism such as the Church of Scotland and in the PCUSA and some other Reformed Churches. The ritual is rare within other branches of Protestantism.

Many individuals use the expression "cross my heart and hope to die" as an oath, making the sign of the cross, in order to show "truthfulness and sincerity", sworn before God, in both personal and legal situations.

Origins
The sign of the cross was originally made in some parts of the Christian world with the right-hand thumb across the forehead only. In other parts of the early Christian world it was done with the whole hand or with two fingers. Around the year 200 in Carthage (modern Tunisia, Africa), Tertullian wrote: "We Christians wear out our foreheads with the sign of the cross." Vestiges of this early variant of the practice remain: in the Roman Rite of the Mass in the Catholic Church, the celebrant makes this gesture on the Gospel book, on his lips, and on his heart at the proclamation of the Gospel; on Ash Wednesday a cross is traced in ashes on the forehead; chrism is applied, among places on the body, on the forehead for the Holy Mystery of Chrismation in the Eastern Orthodox Church.

Gesture

Historically, Western Catholics (the Latin Church) have made the motion from left to right, while Eastern Catholics have made the motion from right to left. The Eastern Orthodox custom is also to make the motion from right to left.

In the Eastern Orthodox and Byzantine Catholic churches, the tips of the first three fingers (the thumb, index, and middle ones) are brought together, and the last two (the "ring" and little fingers) are pressed against the palm. The first three fingers express one's faith in the Trinity, while the remaining two fingers represent the two natures of Jesus, divine and human.

Motion 
The sign of the cross is made by touching the hand sequentially to the forehead, lower chest or stomach, and both shoulders, accompanied by the Trinitarian formula: at the forehead In the name of the Father (or In nomine Patris in Latin); at the stomach or heart and of the Son (et Filii); across the shoulders and of the Holy Spirit/Ghost (et Spiritus Sancti); and finally: Amen.

There are several interpretations, according to Church Fathers: the forehead symbolizes Heaven; the solar plexus (or top of stomach), the earth; the shoulders, the place and sign of power. It also recalls both the Trinity and the Incarnation. Pope Innocent III (1198–1216) explained: "The sign of the cross is made with three fingers, because the signing is done together with the invocation of the Trinity. ... This is how it is done: from above to below, and from the right to the left, because Christ descended from the heavens to the earth..."

There are some variations: for example a person may first place the right hand in holy water. After moving the hand from one shoulder to the other, it may be returned to the top of the stomach. It may also be accompanied by the recitation of a prayer (e.g., the Jesus Prayer, or simply "Lord have mercy"). In some Catholic regions, like Spain, Italy and Latin America, it is customary to form a cross with the index finger and thumb and then to kiss one's thumb at the conclusion of the gesture,

Sequence 
Cyril of Jerusalem (315–386) wrote in his book about the Smaller Sign of the Cross.
Many have been crucified throughout the world, but by none of these are the devils scared; but when they see even the Sign of the Cross of Christ, who was crucified for us, they shudder. For those men died for their own sins, but Christ for the sins of others; for He did no sin, neither was guile found in His mouth. It is not Peter who says this, for then we might suspect that he was partial to his Teacher; but it is Esaias who says it, who was not indeed present with Him in the flesh, but in the Spirit foresaw His coming in the flesh.
For others only hear, but we both see and handle. Let none be weary; take your armour against the adversaries in the cause of the Cross itself; set up the faith of the Cross as a trophy against the gainsayers. For when you are going to dispute with unbelievers concerning the Cross of Christ, first make with your hand the sign of Christ's Cross, and the gainsayer will be silenced. Be not ashamed to confess the Cross; for Angels glory in it, saying, We know whom you seek, Jesus the Crucified. Matthew 28:5 Might you not say, O Angel, I know whom you seek, my Master? But, I, he says with boldness, I know the Crucified. For the Cross is a Crown, not a dishonour.
Let us not then be ashamed to confess the Crucified. Be the Cross our seal made with boldness by our fingers on our brow, and on everything; over the bread we eat, and the cups we drink; in our comings in, and goings out; before our sleep, when we lie down and when we rise up; when we are in the way, and when we are still. Great is that preservative; it is without price, for the sake of the poor; without toil, for the sick; since also its grace is from God. It is the Sign of the faithful, and the dread of devils: for He triumphed over them in it, having made a show of them openly Colossians 2:15; for when they see the Cross they are reminded of the Crucified; they are afraid of Him, who bruised the heads of the dragon. Despise not the Seal, because of the freeness of the gift; out for this the rather honour your Benefactor.

John of Damascus (650–750)

Moreover we worship even the image of the precious and life-giving Cross, although made of another tree, not honouring the tree (God forbid) but the image as a symbol of Christ. For He said to His disciples, admonishing them, Then shall appear the sign of the Son of Man in Heaven Matthew 24:30, meaning the Cross. And so also the angel of the resurrection said to the woman, You seek Jesus of Nazareth which was crucified. Mark 16:6 And the Apostle said, We preach Christ crucified. 1 Corinthians 1:23 For there are many Christs and many Jesuses, but one crucified. He does not say speared but crucified. It behooves us, then, to worship the sign of Christ. For wherever the sign may be, there also will He be. But it does not behoove us to worship the material of which the image of the Cross is composed, even though it be gold or precious stones, after it is destroyed, if that should happen. Everything, therefore, that is dedicated to God we worship, conferring the adoration on Him.

Herbert Thurston indicates that at one time both Eastern and Western Christians moved the hand from the right shoulder to the left. German theologian Valentin Thalhofer thought writings quoted in support of this point, such as that of Innocent III, refer to the small cross made upon the forehead or external objects, in which the hand moves naturally from right to left, and not the big cross made from shoulder to shoulder. Andreas Andreopoulos, author of The Sign of the Cross, gives a more detailed description of the development and the symbolism of the placement of the fingers and the direction of the movement.

Use

Catholicism
Within the Roman Catholic church, the sign of the cross is a sacramental, which the Church defines as "sacred signs which bear a resemblance to the sacraments"; that "signify effects, particularly of a spiritual nature, which are obtained through the intercession of the Church"; and that "always include a prayer, often accompanied by a specific sign, such as the laying on of hands, the sign of the cross, or the sprinkling of holy water (which recalls Baptism)." Section 1670 of the Catechism of the Catholic Church (CCC) states, "Sacramentals do not confer the grace of the Holy Spirit in the way that the sacraments do, but by the Church's prayer, they prepare us to receive grace and dispose us to cooperate with it. For well-disposed members of the faithful, the liturgy of the sacraments and sacramentals sanctifies almost every event of their lives with the divine grace which flows from the Paschal mystery of the Passion, Death, and Resurrection of Christ." Section 1671 of the CCC states: "Among sacramentals blessings (of persons, meals, objects, and places) come first. Every blessing praises God and prays for his gifts. In Christ, Christians are blessed by God the Father 'with every spiritual blessing.' This is why the Church imparts blessings by invoking the name of Jesus, usually while making the holy sign of the cross of Christ." Section 2157 of the CCC states:  "The Christian begins his day, his prayers, and his activities with the Sign of the Cross: 'in the name of the Father and of the Son and of the Holy Spirit. Amen.' The baptized person dedicates the day to the glory of God and calls on the Savior's grace which lets him act in the Spirit as a child of the Father. The sign of the cross strengthens us in temptations and difficulties." 

John Vianney said a genuinely made Sign of the Cross "makes all hell tremble."

The Catholic Church's Ordinary Form of the Roman Rite, the priest and the faithful make the Sign of the Cross at the conclusion of the Entrance Chant and the priest or deacon "makes the Sign of the Cross on the book and on his forehead, lips, and breast" when announcing the Gospel text (to which the people acclaim: "Glory to you, O Lord"). 

The sign of the cross is expected at two points of the Mass: the laity sign themselves during the introductory greeting of the service and at the final blessing; optionally, other times during the Mass when the laity often cross themselves are during a blessing with holy water, when concluding the penitential rite, in imitation of the priest before the Gospel reading (small signs on forehead, lips, and heart), and perhaps at other times out of private devotion.

Eastern Orthodoxy

In the Eastern Orthodox churches, use of the sign of the cross in worship is far more frequent than in the Western churches. While there are points in liturgy at which almost all worshipers cross themselves, Orthodox faithful have significant freedom to make the sign at other times as well, and many make the sign frequently throughout Divine Liturgy or other church services. During the epiclesis (invocation of Holy Spirit as part of the consecration of the Eucharist), the priest makes the sign of the cross over the bread. The early theologian Basil of Caesarea noted the use of the sign of the cross in the rite marking the admission of catechumens.

Old Believers
In the Tsardom of Russia, until the reforms of Patriarch Nikon in the 17th century, it was customary to make the sign of the cross with two fingers. The enforcement of the three-finger sign (as opposed to the two-finger sign of the "Old Rite"), as well as other Nikonite reforms (which alternated certain previous Russian practices to conform with Greek customs), were among the reasons for the schism with the Old Believers whose congregations continue to use the two-finger sign of the cross (other points of dispute included iconography and iconoclasm, as well as changes in liturgical practices).Peter Hauptmann, "Old Believers" in The Encyclopedia of Christianity, Vol. 3 (William B. Eerdmans Publishing Company/Brill: 2003). The Old Believers considered the two-fingered symbol to symbolize the dual nature of Christ as divine and human (the other three fingers in the palm representing the Trinity).

Protestant traditions

Lutheranism
Among Lutherans the practice was widely retained. For example, Luther's Small Catechism states that it is expected before the morning and evening prayers. Lutheranism never abandoned the practice of making the sign of the cross in principle and it was commonly retained in worship at least until the early 19th century. During the 19th and early 20th centuries it was largely in disuse until the liturgical renewal movement of the 1950s and 1960s. One exception is The Lutheran Hymnal (1941) of the Lutheran Church–Missouri Synod (LCMS), which states that "The sign of the cross may be made at the Trinitarian Invocation and at the words of the Nicene Creed 'and the life of the world to come. Since then, the sign of the cross has become fairly commonplace among Lutherans at worship. The sign of the cross is now customary in the Divine Service. Rubrics in contemporary Lutheran worship manuals, including Evangelical Lutheran Worship of the Evangelical Lutheran Church in America and Lutheran Service Book used by LCMS and Lutheran Church–Canada, provide for making the sign of the cross at certain points in the liturgy.

Methodism
The sign of the cross can be found in the Methodist liturgy of the United Methodist Church. John Wesley, the principal leader of the early Methodists, in a 1784 revision of The Book of Common Prayer for Methodist use called The Sunday Service of the Methodists in North America, instructed the presiding minister to make the sign of the cross on the forehead of children just after they have been baptized. (This book was later adopted by Methodists in the United States for their liturgy.) Wesley did not include the sign of the cross in other rites. 

By the early 20th century, the use of the sign of the cross had been dropped from American Methodist worship.  However, its uses was subsequently restored, and the current United Methodist Church allows the pastor to "trace on the forehead of each newly baptized person the sign of the cross." This usage during baptism is reflected in the current (1992) Book of Worship of the United Methodist Church, and is widely practiced (sometimes with oil). Making of the sign is also common among United Methodists on Ash Wednesday, when it is applied by the elder to the foreheads of the laity as a mark of penitence. In some United Methodist congregations, the worship leader makes the sign of the cross toward congregants (for example, when blessing the congregation at the end of the sermon or service), and individual congregants make the sign on themselves when receiving Holy Communion. The sign is also sometimes made by pastors, with oil, upon the foreheads of those seeking healing. In addition to its use in baptism, some Methodist clergy make the sign at the Communion table and during the Confession of Sin and Pardon at the invocation of Jesus' name.

Whether or not a Methodist uses the sign for private prayer is a personal choice, although the UMC encourages it as a devotional practice, stating: "Many United Methodists have found this restoration powerful and meaningful. The ancient and enduring power of the sign of the cross is available for us to use as United Methodists more abundantly now than ever in our history. And more and more United Methodists are expanding its use beyond those suggested in our official ritual."

Reformed tradition and Presbyterians
In some Reformed churches, such as the Presbyterian Church (USA), the sign of the cross is used on the foreheads during baptism and the Reaffirmation of the Baptismal Covenant. It is also used at times during the Benecdition, the minister will make the sign of the cross out toward the congregation while invoking the Trinity.

Anglican and Episcopalian traditions
The English Reformation reduced the use of the sign of the cross compared to its use in Catholic rites. The 1549 Book of Common Prayer reduced the use of the sign of the cross by clergy during liturgy to five occasions, although an added note ("As touching, kneeling, crossing, holding up of hands, and other gestures; they may be used or left as every man's devotion serveth, without blame") gave more leeway to the faithful to make the sign. The 1552 Book of Common Prayer (revived in 1559) reduced the five set uses to a single usage, during baptism. The form of the sign was touching the head, chest, then both shoulders.

The use of the mandatory sign of the cross during baptism was one of several points of contention between the established Church of England and Puritans, whom objected to this sole mandatory sign of the cross,Louis P. Nelson, The Beauty of Holiness: Anglicanism and Architecture in Colonial South Carolina (University of North Carolina Press: 2009), p. 152. and its connections to the church's Catholic past. Nonconformists refused to use the sign. In addition to its Catholic associations, the sign of the cross was significant in English folk traditions, with the sign believed to have a protective function against evil. Puritans viewed the sign of the cross as superstitious and idolatrous. Use of the sign of the cross during baptism was defended by King James I at the Hampton Court Conference and by the 1604 Code of Canons, and its continued use was one of many factors in the departure of Puritans from the Church of England.

The 1789 Prayer Book of the Protestant Episcopal Church in the United States of America made the sign of the cross during baptism optional, apparently in concession to varying views within the church on the sign's use. The 1892 revision of the Prayer Book, however, made the sign mandatory. The Anglo-Catholic movement saw a resurgence in the use of the sign of the cross within Anglicanism, including by laity and in church architecture and decoration; historically, "high church" Anglicans were more apt to make the sign of the cross than "low church" Anglicans.Corinne Ware, What Is Liturgy? Forward Movement Publications (1996), p. 18. Objections to the use of the sign of the church within Anglicanism were largely dropped in the 20th century. In some Anglican traditions, the sign of the cross is made by priests when consecrating the bread and wine of the Eucharist and when giving the priestly blessing at the end of a church service, and is made by congregants when receiving Communion. More recently, some Anglican bishops have adopted the Roman Catholic practice of placing a sign of the cross (+) before their signatures.

Armenian Apostolic
It is common practice in the Armenian Apostolic Church to make the sign of the cross when entering or passing a church, during the start of service and at many times during Divine Liturgy. The motion is performed by joining the first three fingers, to symbolize the Holy Trinity, and putting the two other fingers in the palm, then touching one's forehead, below the chest, left side, then right side and finishing with open hand on the chest again with bowing head.

Assyrian Church of the East
The Assyrian Church of the East uniquely holds the sign of the cross as a sacrament in its own right. Another sacrament unique to the church is the Holy Leaven.

See also

 Christian symbolism
 Crossed fingers
 Mudras
 Prayer in Christianity
 Rushma in Mandaeism
 Veneration

References

External links

Anglicanism
Catholic spirituality
Christian terminology
Cross symbols
Eastern Catholicism
Eastern Orthodox spirituality
Spiritual warfare
Gestures of respect
Hand gestures
Lutheran sacraments and rites
Methodism
Oriental Orthodoxy
Roman Catholic prayers
Sacramentals